Point Iroquois Light is a lighthouse on a Chippewa County bluff in the U.S. state of Michigan.  Point Iroquois and its light mark the division line between Whitefish Bay and the western end of the St. Marys River, the connection between Lake Superior and other Great Lakes.

Point Iroquois includes a larger geographic area than the light station site. It was named for the Iroquois warriors massacred there by the Ojibwe in 1662. Native Algonkians called the point "Nadouenigoning", composed of the words "Nadone" (Iroquois) and "Akron" (bone).

History
In 1620, French explorers Étienne Brûlé and Grenoble became the first recorded white men to the area.  "From that time, Point Iroquois became a familiar landmark" for French explorers, fur traders and missionaries who followed. Sault Ste. Marie was the first white settlement in what became known as Michigan.

First lighthouse
In 1853 Congress, which had approved the construction of the first Soo Locks on the St. Mary's River, appropriated $5,000 for the construction of what would be the first lighthouse at Point Iroquois. In 1855-1856 the United States Lighthouse Board implemented this appropriation and built a wood and rubble stone lighthouse at the Point; this aid to navigation commenced operations on June 18, 1856. The first Point Iroquois light was a  rubble stone tower with a wooden lantern deck, outfitted with a flashing white fourth order Fresnel lens. A dwelling for a full-time lightkeeper was included as part of the complex. The St. Martin Reef Light is a twin of this first light station.

However, as early as 1867, only eleven years after the first light went into operation, a government inspector was questioning the construction quality of the first light station and preparing the ground for its replacement. Furthermore, following the American Civil War, the United States Lighthouse Board had entered a lighthouse (and life saving station) building boom on the Great Lakes.

Second lighthouse and light station
In 1870, after the first lighthouse and keepers' quarters building were torn down.  the second and current Point Iroquois Light was constructed, this time at an estimated cost of $18,000. The present Cape Cod style white brick lighthouse was built and ran continuously for 93 years, guiding ships in and out of the Soo Locks. The new Light and keepers' quarters became visual focuses of the shoreline lumber community of Brimley, Michigan.

Its buildings
In 1885, a bell tower was erected, which incorporated a Stevens automatic bell striking machine. In 1890, the bell tower was torn down, and a fog signal building was built with steam whistles installed. In 1926 they were replaced by Type F diaphone fog horns.

In 1905, a two-floor extension was added to the 1871 building, providing living space for another assistant keeper, bringing the staff to three Lighthouse keepers. At peak operation, the station was manned by a Head Keeper and two Assistant Keepers. The children of the keepers and local fisherman were enough to populate a local school on the grounds for a period. Other buildings on the site included: an assistant keeper's quarters, fog signal building (now gone), three barns, a chicken house, boat house, oil house, outhouse and well house.

Deactivation
The station was deactivated in 1962, replaced by the Canadian operated Gros Cap Reefs Light, an unmanned buoy-type beacon in the St. Marys River channel.

In 1993 the light quarters and light were completely renovated.

In 1975 the Point Iroquois Light was listed on the National Register of Historic Places Reference #75000940.  It is also on the state list.

The Point Iroquois Light today

It is considered to be iconic, and has been the subject of memorabilia.

The land and lighthouse are now part of the Hiawatha National Forest and the light is a Marine Museum. Restoration efforts are being conducted under the auspices of the Bay Mills/Brimley Historical Research Society, to whom the site is leased.

In 1963, the original lens was sent to the Smithsonian Institution. A fourth order Fresnel lens taken from Martin Reef Light is on display in the Lighthouse keeper's house.

The museum has one apartment furnished to give an idea of the lightkeepers' everyday lives. Other rooms show lighthouse technology, history of navigational aids, and historical photos. This light station housed three families. The double residence houses volunteers who work on the lighthouse restoration and give tours of the museum, gift shop and tower.

The tower and museum are open to the public from Memorial Day through October 15. Operations are seven days per week. Everyday from 10:00 a.m. to 5.00 p.m., seven days a week. Open weekends, Friday through Sunday, they reopen from 7:00 p.m. to 9:00 p.m.
 M-221 into Brimley, Michigan then turn left onto 6 Mile Rd which leads to the lighthouse about  down the road.

See also
Comet (steamboat)
Lighthouses in the United States
Great Lakes Storm of 1913 and Shipwrecks of the 1913 Great Lakes storm

Further reading
Bacon, Betty Byrnes, (1989) Lighthouse Memories: Growing Up at Point Iroquois in the 1920s (Bay Mills, Michigan: Bay Mills-Brimley Historical Research Society).

Notes

External links
 
 
 Point Iroquois Light Station - U.S. Forest Service
 Aerial photos, Point Iroquois Light, marinas.com.
 Interactive map of lighthouses in eastern Lake Superior.

Lighthouses completed in 1856
Lighthouses completed in 1870
Houses completed in 1870
Museums in Chippewa County, Michigan
Lighthouses on the National Register of Historic Places in Michigan
Michigan State Historic Sites
Lighthouse museums in Michigan
Hiawatha National Forest
National Register of Historic Places in Chippewa County, Michigan
1856 establishments in Michigan
Lighthouses in Chippewa County, Michigan